The Instituto Geográfico Nacional (IGN), or National Geographic Institute is a Spanish government agency, dependent on the Spanish Ministry of Public Works. It is the national mapping agency for Spain, together with the Centro Nacional de Información Geográfica (CNIG).

Since 2015, most of its products (including MTN50 and MTN25 topographic maps, and PNOA aerial photographies) are freely available online, and licensed under a CC-BY-4.0-like license, as FOM/2807/2015 decree requires its products must be released under a free license.

Roles 
The IGN is responsible for:
 Astronomic observations and research. Manages the Yebes Observatory, devoted to radio astronomy.
 Observation and maintenance of the national geodetic networks
 Making and updating the cartography for the country (including official National Topographic Maps, called MTN50 (1:50,000 scale) and MTN25 (1:25,000 scale))
 Making and maintaining the IDEE or Infraestructura de Datos Espaciales de España, the Spanish Spatial Data Infrastructure
 R&D and application of teledetection systems
 Geophysics and gravimetry
 Seismographic and volcanic activity analysis

Main products

MTN50 
MTN50, acronym for Mapa Topográfico Nacional (National Topographic Map) scale 1:50,000, is produced by the National Geographic Institute (IGN), being obtained by direct processes of observation and measurement of the Earth's surface. It constitutes, together with the MTN25, the official basic cartography of Spain. It consists of a total of 1073 sheets.

Its original publication began in 1875 and did not finish until 1968. In 1985, the updating of its sheets was stopped, to focus all efforts on the production of the then new National Topographic Map at a scale of 1:25,000 (MTN25).

In 1999, the production of a new, completely renovated, MTN50 is resumed. This new MTN50 includes shading, and is generated by cartographic generalization processes, using digital technology, from the corresponding sheets of the MTN25. The publication of the first edition of this new digital MTN50 began in 1999, with sheet 605 (Aranjuez), and ended in 2010, with sheet 262 (Salvaterra de Miño), making a total of 1073 sheets.

MTN25 
MTN25, acronym for Mapa Topográfico Nacional (National Topographic Map) scale 1:25,000, consists, as of October 2017, of 4,098 sheets in vector format and 4,102 in raster format, sheets of 5' latitude by 10' longitude, a distribution that inherits the distribution table of the MTN50, with each one of the MTN50 sheets being divided into four quarters that are identified with Roman numerals (each one of the quarters making a MTN25 sheet), with slight modifications for sheets that cover very little territory.

PNOA 
The National Plan for Aerial Orthophotography (in Spanish, Plan Nacional de Ortofotografía Aérea, abbreviated as PNOA) began in 2004 and aims to obtain digital aerial orthophotographs of the entire Spanish territory, with a fixed update period, currently 3 years.

The resolution of orthophotos has been changing over time and since 2017 the resolution is at least 25 cm, although in some areas resolutions of 15 cm are reached.

The PNOA is a cooperative project in which the Government of Spain and the Autonomous Communities participate. A single photogrammetric flight is carried out, and then a rigorous treatment of the data follows, in which technical specifications agreed upon by all the participating Public Administrations are complied. This approach of cooperative production between the different administrations is in accordance with the spirit of the Inspire Directive for the establishment of a Geographic Data Infrastructure in Europe, which seeks that the maximum level of detail of geographic information is captured only once and that it is shared openly among the different agents that need it.

General directors 
 Carlos Ibáñez e Ibáñez de Ibero (1870–1889)
 Severo Gómez Núñez (1917, 1921–1922)
 Rodolfo Núñez de las Cuevas (1974–1980)
 Julio Morencos Tevar (1980–1983)
 Emilio Murcia Navarro (1983–1984)
 Ángel Arévalo Barroso (1985–1994)
 José Teófilo Serrano Beltrán (1994–1995)
 Ricardo Díaz Zoido (1995–1996)
 José Antonio Canas Torres (1996–2002)
 Alberto Sereno Álvarez (2002–2012)
 Amador Elena Córdoba (from 2012)

References

External links 

 Official webpage
 Spain ortophotographies (PNOA) and National Topographic Maps (MTN50 (1:50,000 scale) and MTN25 (1:25,000 scale)) download website

Geography of Spain
Government of Spain
National mapping agencies